Almyasovo (Älmäs) is a rural locality (a village) in Ibrayevsky Selsoviet, Kugarchinsky District, Bashkortostan, Russia. The population was 301 as of 2010. There are 5 streets.

Geography 
Almyasovo is located 12 km north of Mrakovo (the district's administrative centre) by road. Tyulebayevo is the nearest rural locality.

References 

Rural localities in Kugarchinsky District